QuakeFinder is a company focused on developing  a system for earthquake prediction. QuakeFinder operates as a project of aerospace engineering firm Stellar Solutions, and by subscriptions and sponsorships from the public.

In the 1970s, scientists were optimistic that a practical method for predicting earthquakes would soon be found, but by the 1990s continuing failure led many to question whether it was even possible. Extensive searches have reported many possible earthquake precursors, but, so far, such precursors have not been reliably identified across significant spatial and temporal scales. Based on the results of this research, most scientists are pessimistic and some maintain that earthquake prediction is inherently impossible.

QuakeFinder has deployed a network of sensor stations that detect the electromagnetic pulses the team believes precede major earthquakes. Each sensor is believed to have a range of approximately 10 miles (16 km) from the instrument to the source of the pulses. As of 2016, the company says they have 125 stations in California, and their affiliate Jorge Heraud says he has 10 sites in Peru. Using these sensors, Heraud says that he has been able to triangulate pulses seen from multiple sites, in order to determine the origin of the pulses. He said that the pulses are seen beginning from 11 to 18 days before an impending earthquake, and have been used to determine the location and timing of future seismic events.

However, insofar as a verifiable prediction would require a publicly-stated announcement of the location, time, and size of an impending event before its occurrence, neither Quakefinder nor Heraud have yet verifiably predicted an earthquake, much less issued multiple predictions of the type that might be objectively testable for statistical significance.

Background 
In 2010, QuakeFinder researchers said that they had observed ultra low frequency magnetic pulses emitted by the Earth near the 2007 magnitude 5.4 Alum Rock earthquake near San Jose, California, starting two weeks prior to the event. Researchers from the United States Geological Survey (USGS) studied similar phenomena during the Parkfield earthquake experiment. These researchers did not find evidence of electromagnetic earthquake precursors.

QuakeFinder advisor Friedemann Freund suggests that slip along a fault activates charge carriers and underground electrical currents, producing electromagnetic pulses that can be detected with magnetometers. The underground currents may also cause air-conductivity changes and ground heating. QuakeFinder says that an infrared signature of the Alum Rock earthquake was detected by NASA's GOES weather satellite.

The QuakeFinder team believes that the effects they are trying to study are localized in time and space, and aim to eventually be  able determine "the time (within 1-2 weeks), location (within 20-40km) and magnitude (within ± 1 increment of Richter magnitude) of earthquake greater than M5.4". There is no independent verification of their results so far.

See also 
 Earthquake prediction
 Earthquake light
 Earthquake warning system
 Quakesat

References

External links 
 QuakeFinder.com
 Parkfield Earthquake Experiment
 
 

Earthquake and seismic risk mitigation